A sniper is a trained sharpshooter who operates alone, in a pair, or with a sniper team to maintain close visual contact with a target and engage the targets from concealed positions or distances exceeding the detection capabilities of enemy personnel.

Military snipers
Some notable military snipers include

Non-military snipers
Not all snipers are highly trained professional soldiers. The term is sometimes ambiguously used to describe criminals firing from cover at long range with a rifle, as well as police sharpshooters. Some non-military snipers include:

See also
Snipers of the Soviet Union

References

Sniper